This page lists chemical and physical properties of 1,1,1,2-tetrafluoroethane.

Vapor Pressure at 25 °C (77 °F) kPa 666.1
bar 6.661
psia 96.61

Heat of Vaporization at Boiling Point kJ/kg 217.2
Btu/lb 93.4

Thermal Conductivity at 25 °C (77 °F)   Liquid W/m·K 0.0824  Btu/hr·ft°F 0.0478

Vapor at 1 atm (101.3 kPa or 1.013 bar) W/m·K 0.0145
Btu/hr·ft°F 0.00836

Viscosity at 25 °C (77 °F)
Liquid mPa·S (cP) 0.202
Vapor at 1 atm (101.3 kPa or 1.013 bar) mPa·S (cP) 0.012

Solubility of HFC-134a wt% 0.15
in Water at 25 °C (77 °F) and 1 atm (101.3 kPa or 1.013 bar)

Solubility of Water in HFC-134a wt% 0.11
at 25 °C (77 °F)

Flammability Limits in Air at 1 atm (101.3 kPa or 1.013 bar) vol % None

Autoignition Temperature 

Ozone Depletion Potential (ODP) — 0

Halocarbon Global Warming Potential (HGWP) — 0.28
(For CFC-11, HGWP = 1)

Global Warming Potential (GWP) — 1,200
(100 yr ITH. For CO2, GWP = 1)

TSCA Inventory Status — Reported/Included

Toxicity AEL* (8- and 12-hr TWA) ppm (v/v) 1,000

 AEL (Acceptable Exposure Limit) is an airborne inhalation exposure limit established by DuPont that specifies time-weighted
average concentrations to which nearly all workers may be repeatedly exposed without adverse effects.
Note: kPa is absolute pressure.

References

Chemical data pages
Chemical data pages cleanup